.gent is a GeoTLD for Ghent, Flanders in Belgium.

See also
.be
.vlaanderen
.brussels

References

Computer-related introductions in 2014
Generic top-level domains
Internet in Belgium